Events from the year 1823 in Denmark.

Incumbents
 Monarch – Frederick VI

Events

Births
 27 January  Ernst Peymann, army officer (born 1737)
 19 April – Edvard Jünger, precision mechanic (died 1899)
 22 April – Line Luplau, women's right activist and suffragist  (died 1891)
 30 April – Peter Atke Castberg, physician (born 1779)
 15 September – Emanuel Larsen, marine painter (died 1859)
 30 October – Auguste Sophie Friederike, princess of Hesse-Cassel (died 1889)
 4 December – Alfred Benzon, pharmacist and industrialist  (died 1884)

Deaths
 30 March – Carl Wilhelm Jessen, naval officer (born 1764)
 6 June – Christian Conrad, Count of Danneskiold-Samsøe, councillor, board member, landowner and magistrate (born 1774)
 Amalie Sophie Holstein, noble and courtier (born 1748)

References

 
1820s in Denmark
Denmark
Years of the 19th century in Denmark